The Petite rivière Manitou (English: Little Manitou River) is a tributary of Manitou River, flowing in the unorganized territory of Lac-Jérôme, in the Minganie Regional County Municipality, in the administrative region of Côte-Nord, in province of Quebec, in Canada.

This wild territory does not have a motorized access road. The closest route is route 138 which runs along the north shore of the Gulf of St. Lawrence. You can only access this area by seaplane or snowmobile in winter.

Geography 
The Little Manitou River originates from an unidentified lake in the unorganized territory of Lac-Jérôme, in the Minganie Regional County Municipality.

The course of the Little Manitou River descends southward between the Sheldrake River (east side) and Manitou River (west side).

Upper course of the Little Manitou River ( segment)

  first south, up to a river T, then west, forming a hook to the south; finally by crossing a lake towards the south, to its mouth;
  towards the southwest, first crossing a lake, then crossing the western end of a second lake, up to a bend in the river, corresponding to the discharge (coming from the east) of a small lake;
  westward first, crossing four small lakes, then forming a few hooks, especially in areas of rapids, up to a bend in the river;
  towards the south in an increasingly deep valley, forming a small hook towards the west, then descending relatively in a straight line, until a bend of the river corresponding to the discharge (coming from the west) of a set of lakes;
  towards the south, crossing a lake, to its mouth;

Lower course of the Little Manitou River (segment of )

  towards the east forming a hook towards the south, then again towards the east, until the discharge (coming from the north) of a river;
  towards the south, crossing an unidentified lake over its full length, up to a bend in the river; then east to a bend in the river corresponding to the discharge (coming from the east) of a lake;
  towards the south-east in a deep valley, to a bend in the river, corresponding to the discharge (coming from the west) of a lake;
  towards the south-east, to a bend in the river corresponding to the discharge (coming from the east) of a lake;
  towards the south, first forming a loop towards the north, a large S, a loop towards the south, then orienting towards the southeast, until its mouth.

Toponymy 
The toponym "Petite rivière Manitou" is linked to the toponym "rivière Manitou" of which it is a tributary.

The toponym “Petite rivière Manitou” was made official on December 5, 1968.

Notes and references

See also 

 Minganie Regional County Municipality
 Lac-Jérôme, a TNO
 Manitou River

Rivers of Côte-Nord
Minganie Regional County Municipality